St. Olaf's Church, or variants thereof, refers to churches dedicated to Olaf II of Norway, and may refer to:

Denmark 
 St. Olaf's Church, Helsingør,
 Sankt Ols Kirke, Bornholm

Faroe Islands 
 Saint Olav's Church, Kirkjubøur

Estonia 
 St. Olaf's Church, Tallinn
 St. Olaf's Church, Nõva
 St. Olaf's Church, Vormsi
 St. Olaf's Church ruins, Väike-Pakri
 St. Olaf's Chapel ruins in Suur-Pakri

Finland 
 St. Olaf's Church, Jomala, Åland Islands
 St. Olaf's Church, Jyväskylä
 St. Olaf's Church, Tyrvää, Sastamala
 St. Olaf's Church, Ulvila

Norway 
 St. Olaf's Church, Balestrand

Russia 
 Saint Olaf's Church in Novgorod

United Kingdom 
 St Olaf's Church, Poughill, Bude, Cornwall
 St Olaf's Church, Wasdale, Cumbria
 St Olaf's Church (Balliasta), Unst, Shetland
 St Olaf's Church (Cruden), Cruden, Scotland
 St Olaf's Church (Lunda Wick), Unst, Shetland
 St Olaf's Church (Voe), Shetland Mainland

United States 
 St. Olaf Kirke, a historical Lutheran church located near Cranfills Gap, Texas

See also 
 St. Olave's Church